The R801 road is a regional road in Dublin, Ireland.

The official definition of the R801 from the Roads Act 1993 (Classification of Regional Roads) Order 2006  states:

R801: North Wall, Dublin

Between its junction with R105 at Beresford Place and its junction with R131 at East Wall Road via Custom House Quay and North Wall Quay all in the city of Dublin.

See also
Roads in Ireland
Regional road

References

Regional roads in the Republic of Ireland
Roads in County Dublin